In mathematics, the Lefschetz fixed-point theorem is a formula that counts the fixed points of a continuous mapping from a compact topological space  to itself  by means of traces of the induced mappings on the homology groups of . It is named after Solomon Lefschetz, who first stated it in 1926.

The counting is subject to an imputed multiplicity at a fixed point called the fixed-point index. A weak version of the theorem is enough to show that a mapping without any fixed point must have rather special topological properties (like a rotation of a circle).

Formal statement
For a formal statement of the theorem, let

be a continuous map from a compact triangulable space  to itself.

A simple version of the Lefschetz fixed-point theorem states: if

then  has at least one fixed point, i.e., there exists at least one  in  such that .  In fact, since the Lefschetz number has been defined at the homology level, the conclusion can be extended to say that any map homotopic to  has a fixed point as well.

Note however that the converse is not true in general:  may be zero even if  has fixed points, as is the case for the identity map on odd-dimensional spheres.

Sketch of a proof
First, by applying the simplicial approximation theorem, one shows that if  has no fixed points, then (possibly after subdividing )  is homotopic to a fixed-point-free simplicial map (i.e., it sends each simplex to a different simplex).  This means that the diagonal values of the matrices of the linear maps induced on the simplicial chain complex of  must be all be zero.  Then one notes that, in general, the Lefschetz number can also be computed using the alternating sum of the matrix traces of the aforementioned linear maps (this is true for almost exactly the same reason that the Euler characteristic has a definition in terms of homology groups; see below for the relation to the Euler characteristic).  In the particular case of a fixed-point-free simplicial map, all of the diagonal values are zero, and thus the traces are all zero.

Lefschetz–Hopf theorem
A stronger form of the theorem, also known as the Lefschetz–Hopf theorem, states that, if  has only finitely many fixed points, then

From this theorem one deduces the Poincaré–Hopf theorem for vector fields.

Relation to the Euler characteristic
The Lefschetz number of the identity map on a finite CW complex can be easily computed by realizing that each  can be thought of as an identity matrix, and so each trace term is simply the dimension of the appropriate homology group. Thus the Lefschetz number of the identity map is equal to the alternating sum of the Betti numbers of the space, which in turn is equal to the Euler characteristic . Thus we have

Relation to the Brouwer fixed-point theorem
The Lefschetz fixed-point theorem generalizes the Brouwer fixed-point theorem, which states that every continuous map from the -dimensional closed unit disk  to  must have at least one fixed point.

This can be seen as follows:  is compact and triangulable, all its homology groups except  are zero, and every continuous map  induces the identity map , whose trace is one; all this together implies that  is non-zero for any continuous map .

Historical context
Lefschetz's focus was not on fixed points of maps, but rather on what are now called coincidence points of maps.

Lefschetz proved that if the coincidence number is nonzero, then  and  have a coincidence point. He noted in his paper that letting  and letting  be the identity map gives a simpler result, which we now know as the fixed-point theorem.

Frobenius
The Lefschetz trace formula holds in this context, and reads:

This formula involves usual cohomology, rather than cohomology with compact supports.

The Lefschetz trace formula can also be generalized to algebraic stacks over finite fields.

See also
Fixed-point theorems
Lefschetz zeta function
Holomorphic Lefschetz fixed-point formula

Notes

References

External links
 

Fixed-point theorems
Theory of continuous functions
Theorems in algebraic topology